The African Youth Olympic Futsal Qualifying Tournament, is the main youth national futsal competition of the Confederation of African Football nations. It was first held in 2018 and has been played every four years. It is a qualification to Futsal at the 2018 Summer Youth Olympics – Boys' tournament.

Results

Participating nations

Legend
 — Champions
 — Runners-up
 — Third place
 — Fourth place
 — Semifinals
5th — 5th place
R1 — Round 1
Q — Qualified for upcoming tournament
 ×  – Did not enter
 •  – Did not qualify
 ×  – Withdrew before qualification
 ••  – Withdrew before or during tournament
     – To be determined
 — Hosts

Futsal at the Summer Youth Olympics – Boys' tournament Qualifiers
Legend
1st – Champions
2nd – Runners-up
3rd – Third place
4th – Fourth place
QF – Quarterfinals
R2 – Round 2 (1989–2008, second group stage, top 8; 2012–present: knockout round of 16)
R1 – Round 1
     – Hosts

Q – Qualified for upcoming tournament

References

External links

 
Confederation of African Football competitions for national teams
International futsal competitions
Futsal competitions in Africa
African championships
Recurring sporting events established in 1996